is a Japanese film director and screenwriter first known for his soft-core pornographic pink films of the 1990s. In recent years, he has directed such major commercial hits as 64: Part I, 64: Part II, and The 8-Year Engagement, while continuing to make independent art films like Heaven's Story and The Chrysanthemum and the Guillotine.

Life and career
"I try to show relationships, I make films about love. It's not just about the act of having sex, but what leads up to it and what comes after. What are the feelings of the people before, while they do it and after they did it? It's this development that interests me. I don't care very much about rape, because it's very one-sided and doesn't allow for this kind of development... I don't want to depict characters as having sex, but as making love."-- Takahisa Zeze
Takahisa Zeze was born in 1960 and graduated from Kyoto University in 1986. While attending this prestigious university, Zeze began making experimental films. He began his career in the film industry working for Shishi Productions as a screenwriter and assistant director for various pink film directors, including Hisayasu Satō.

Zeze usually writes the scripts for his films, which often contain examinations of social concerns not usually found in the pink film genre. His style is much less violent than Sato's, and rarely includes rape, one of the traditional thematic staples of the pink film from earliest times. Zeze also engages in more satire and self-conscious humor than is typical in the genre. He has the habit of giving his films eccentric titles during their production which the studios replace with a more commercially exploitable name before release. For example, Zeze's title My Existence Is a Phenomenon Based on the Hypothesis of Blue Light Generated by Organic Currency was changed to Amazon Garden: Uniform Lesbians. He sometimes uses whimsical pseudonyms in his directorial credit, such as "Jean-Luc Zeze" or "South Pole #1". After a decade of making pink films, Zeze turned to mainstream releases in 1997 with Kokkuri. While continuing to work in the pink film genre, he has since directed several mainstream successes such as Rush!, Hysteric and Dog Star. In 2002 Zeze was honored with a career retrospective at Italy's Far East Film Festival.

He often works with the cinematographer Kōichi Saitō.

Partial filmography

References

External links
 
 
|-
! colspan="3" style="background: #DAA520;" | Pink Grand Prix
|-

|-

1960 births
Japanese film directors
Pink film directors
Japanese screenwriters
Living people
Kyoto University alumni